Payback Time is the debut album by the Iranian-Danish Eurodance producer DJ Aligator, released in 2000 on Kenneth Bager's FLEX Records. It includes the four times platinum selling single "The Whistle Song", which peaked at No. 5 on the UK Singles Chart in 2002.

Track listing

Charts

References

External links
 Payback Time at Discogs

2000 debut albums
DJ Aligator albums